Ruth Meiers (November 6, 1925 – March 19, 1987) was the first female Lieutenant Governor of North Dakota. She became the 33rd Lieutenant Governor in 1985. Meiers was diagnosed with lung and brain cancer in 1986 and died in office six months later in March 1987. The Ruth Meiers Hospitality House is named in her honor. Meiers was a social worker in Mountrail County, North Dakota. In 1974, Meiers served in the North Dakota House of Representatives as a Democrat.

See also
List of female lieutenant governors in the United States

References

External links
Chronology of North Dakota in the 1980s
Ruth Meiers Hospitality House

1925 births
1987 deaths
People from Mountrail County, North Dakota
Lieutenant Governors of North Dakota
Deaths from cancer in North Dakota
Women state legislators in North Dakota
20th-century American politicians
20th-century American women politicians
Democratic Party members of the North Dakota House of Representatives